Kasumigaoka Station is the name of two train stations in Japan:

 Kasumigaoka Station (Hyōgo)
 Kasumigaoka Station (Nara)

See also
 Kokuritsu-Kyōgijō Station, for the Japan National Stadium